Hindasgeri is a village in Dharwad district of Karnataka, India.

Demographics 
As of the 2011 Census of India there were 270 households in Hindasgeri and a total population of 1,462 consisting of 747 males and 715 females. There were 200 children ages 0-6.

References

Villages in Dharwad district